The 1953 Campeonato Paulista da Primeira Divisão, organized by the Federação Paulista de Futebol, was the 52nd season of São Paulo's top professional football league. São Paulo won the title for the 7th time. Nacional and Portuguesa Santista were relegated and the top scorer was Palmeiras's Humberto Tozzi with 22 goals.

Championship
The championship was disputed in a double-round robin system, with the team with the most points winning the title and the two teams with the fewest points being relegated.

Top Scores

References

Campeonato Paulista seasons
Paulista